The Great Midwest Athletic Conference (G-MAC) is a college athletic conference affiliated with the National Collegiate Athletic Association (NCAA) at the Division II level. It was named the 24th (at the time) NCAA Division II conference and operates in the Great Lakes and East South Central States regions of the United States. The G-MAC began conference play in the 2012–13 academic year hosting 12 championships and continued to work through the educational assessment program. The conference received approval and became an active Division II conference in 2013–14, hosting 17 championships.

History

The initial announcement of a potential new conference surfaced in June 2011 when the presidents and athletic directors of Cedarville University, Notre Dame College, Urbana University, and Ursuline College met to discuss plans for a new Division II conference.

Soon after the initial meeting, Central State University joined and became a fifth member. In October 2011, Kentucky Wesleyan College announced that the school will join the G-MAC, withdrawing from its current conference, the Great Lakes Valley Conference.

In November 2011, Trevecca Nazarene University was accepted as another charter member of the conference. Trevecca had begun the process of transitioning from NAIA to NCAA Division II membership in July, 2011 and entered a provisional NCAA membership year during the conference's initially planned start for the 2013–14 academic year. In late November, the conference announced the hiring of Tom Daeger as Conference Commissioner, with offices in Indianapolis.

On February 20, 2012 the Great Midwest Athletic Conference announced the NCAA had accepted the G-MAC as the 24th NCAA Division ll conference. The conference then added two more members when it was announced on April 23 and May 1, 2012, that the University of Virginia's College at Wise (UVA Wise) and Georgetown College had been granted provisional membership in the conference pending their approval by the NCAA Division II Membership Committee. Georgetown College was rejected for Division II membership, but applied to join Division II in 2014. However, they were denied acceptance once again by the Membership Council. As of 2021, Georgetown has made no further attempt to join Division II.

In the fall of 2012, it was announced that Urbana and UVA Wise would spend only one season as active members of the G-MAC. At the same time, the G-MAC announced that three West Virginia schools had accepted invitations to join the conference, starting in July 2013—Alderson Broaddus University, Davis & Elkins College, and Ohio Valley University. All three schools were previously members of the West Virginia Intercollegiate Athletic Conference (WVIAC), which disbanded after most of its football-sponsoring schools announced their departure for a new D-II league that eventually became the Mountain East Conference (MEC). On October 16, 2012, the G-MAC announced that Salem International University, since renamed Salem University, would join the conference on July 1, 2013. Salem would leave the G-MAC in 2016 to become a Division II independent.

On July 12, 2013, the Great Midwest Athletic Conference received official approval from the NCAA Division II Membership Committee, recognizing the Conference as an active NCAA Division II conference. On the same day, it was announced that Ursuline College had been approved as an active NCAA DII member and Trevecca Nazarene University successfully completed its Year Two candidacy and was moved into the Provisional Year of the membership process by the NCAA Division II Membership Committee.

On August 7, 2013, the Great Midwest Athletic Conference partnered with Cumberland University as it embarked on a transition to potential NCAA Division II membership. The G-MAC Presidents Council unanimously admitted Cumberland as a provisional member effective immediately and would have sponsored the institution as it worked through the NCAA Division II membership application process. In July 2014, Cumberland was denied acceptance into the NCAA by the Membership Council. As in the case of Georgetown, Cumberland has made no further attempt to join Division II.

On August 30, 2018, Davis & Elkins announced that it would reunite with most of its former WVIAC rivals in the Mountain East Conference after the 2018–19 school year. The school remains a G-MAC affiliate in men's lacrosse, a sport that the MEC does not sponsor.

On February 1, 2019, Malone announced that it had eliminated football and "remains committed to athletic competition in the NCAA Div. II and as members of the Great Midwest Athletic Conference (G-MAC)."

On May 19, 2020, Ashland University announced they would join the Great Midwest Athletic Conference from the Great Lakes Intercollegiate Athletic Conference for the 2021–22 school year.

On June 5, 2020, another former WVIAC member, Alderson Broaddus, announced that it was leaving the G-MAC to join most of its old rivals in the Mountain East Conference for the 2020–21 school year.

The most recent changes to the conference membership were announced in 2021. On February 11, Ohio Valley announced that it would return to NAIA and join the River States Conference that July, and on April 29, Northwood University announced that they would also join the G-MAC from the GLIAC for the 2022-23 school year.

The G-MAC would gain a member later in 2021; on August 18, the conference and Thomas More University announced that the school, currently a member of the NAIA Mid-South Conference, would become a provisional G-MAC member in 2022. With G-MAC acceptance in hand, Thomas More applied to rejoin the NCAA and was officially accepted as a provisional D-II member on July 14, 2022. The school accordingly became a provisional G-MAC member, but continues to compete in the NAIA and in the Mid-South until July 2023.

Also for the 2021–22 season, G-MAC announced a partnership with Conference Carolinas to create a men's and women's bowling championship (even though men's bowling is not considered a varsity sport by the NCAA). Each conference will organize its regular season independently but the postseason will be called Conference Carolinas/Great Midwest Athletic Conference Men's and Women's Bowling Championships.

Chronological timeline
 2012 - The Great Midwest Athletic Conference (G-MAC) was founded. Charter members included Cedarville University, Central State University, Kentucky Wesleyan College, Trevecca Nazarene University, Urbana University, Ursuline College and the University of Virginia's College at Wise (UVA Wise), effective beginning the 2012–13 academic year.
 2013 - Urbana and UVA Wise left the G-MAC to join the newly-created Mountain East Conference, effective after the 2012–13 academic year.
 2013 - Alderson Broaddus University, Davis & Elkins College, Ohio Valley University and Salem University joined the G-MAC, effective in the 2013–14 academic year.
 2015 - Central State left the G-MAC to join the Southern Intercollegiate Athletic Conference (SIAC), effective after the 2014–15 academic year.
 2016 - Malone University joined the G-MAC, effective in the 2016–17 academic year.
 2016 - Lake Erie College, Mercyhurst University, Seton Hill University and Walsh University joined the G-MAC as affiliate members for men's lacrosse, effective in the 2017 spring season (2016–17 academic year).
 2017 - The University of Findlay, Hillsdale College and Ohio Dominican University joined the G-MAC (along with Lake Erie and Walsh upgrading for all sports), effective in the 2017–18 academic year.
 2017 - Wheeling Jesuit University (now Wheeling University) joined the G-MAC as an affiliate member for men's lacrosse, effective in the 2018 (2017–18 academic year).
 2018 - Tiffin University joined the G-MAC, effective in the 2018–19 academic year.
 2019 - Davis & Elkins left the G-MAC to join the Mountain East Conference, effective after the 2018–19 academic year.
 2021 - Alderson Broaddus left the G-MAC to join the Mountain East Conference, effective in the 2020–21 academic year.
 2021 - Ohio Valley left the G-MAC and the NCAA to join the River States Conference of the National Association of Intercollegiate Athletics (NAIA), effective after the 2020–21 academic year.
 2021 - Ashland University joined the G-MAC, effective in the 2021–22 academic year.
 2022 - Northwood University and Thomas More University joined the G-MAC, effective with the 2022–23 academic year. Although Thomas More joined the conference as a provisional member, it continues to compete in the NAIA and the Mid-South Conference in 2022–23 before beginning competition as a full G-MAC member in July 2023.

Member schools

Current members
The G-MAC currently has 13 full members, all are private schools:

Notes

Affiliate members
The G-MAC has five affiliate members, all are private schools:

Notes

Future members
The G-MAC has one member that joined for administrative purposes in July 2022, but will not start conference competition until July 2023. It is also a private school.

Notes

Former members
The G-MAC had seven former full members, all but two were private schools. School names and nicknames reflect those used during G-MAC membership:

Notes

Membership timeline

Sports

In swimming and diving for both sexes, the G-MAC and Mountain East Conference operate as a single league, conducting a combined conference championship meet.

In bowling, Great Midwest Athletic Conference and Conference Carolinas made a partnership to make a men's and women's bowling championship (even though men's bowling is not considered a varsity sport by the NCAA). Each conference will organize its regular season independently but the postseason will be called Conference Carolinas/Great Midwest Athletic Conference Men's and Women's Bowling Championships.

Men's sponsored sports by school

Women's sponsored sports by school

Other sponsored sports by school
Future members in gray.

In addition to the above:
 Thomas More sponsors varsity teams in the following non-NCAA sports: archery, men's bowling, and men's rugby. It also considers its band, cheerleaders (male and female) and dance team (all-female) to be varsity athletes.

Championships

References

External links

 
Organizations based in Indianapolis
Sports in Indianapolis
Sports organizations established in 2011
Articles which contain graphical timelines
2011 establishments in the United States